Rodrigo José Carbone (born March 17, 1974) is a former Brazilian football player.

Club statistics

References

External links

 
awx.jp

1974 births
Living people
Brazilian footballers
Brazilian expatriate footballers
J1 League players
Kashima Antlers players
Expatriate footballers in Japan
Jeonnam Dragons players
K League 1 players
Expatriate footballers in Poland
Expatriate footballers in South Korea
Association football forwards